The 2021–22 Estonian Cup was the 32st season of the Estonian main domestic football knockout tournament. Paide Linnameeskond won their first title and qualified for the 2022–23 UEFA Europa Conference League.

First round (1/64)
The draw was made by Estonian Football Association on 20 May 2021.
League level of the club in the brackets.
Rahvaliiga RL (people's league) is a league organized by Estonian Football Association, but not part of the main league system.

Byes
These teams were not drawn and secured a place in the second round without playing:
 Meistriliiga (Level 1): FC Kuressaare, Tallinna JK Legion, Nõmme Kalju FC, Tartu JK Tammeka
 Esiliiga (2): Tartu JK Welco, JK Tallinna Kalev, Tallinna FC Flora U21, Pärnu Jalgpalliklubi
 Esiliiga B (3): Läänemaa JK, JK Tabasalu, FC Tallinn, 
 II Liiga (4): Paide Linnameeskond III, FA Tartu Kalev, Põhja-Tallinna JK Volta, Tartu FC Helios, 
 III Liiga (5): Saku Sporting, FC Maardu Aliens, Pärnu JK Poseidon, Tallinna FC Zapoos, JK Tabasalu II, Tallinna SC ReUnited, Tallinna FC Eston Villa, Türi Ganvix JK, Jõhvi FC Phoenix
 IV Liiga (6): Tallinna FC Soccernet, Maarjamäe FC Vigri, Rumori Calcio Tallinn
 Rahvaliiga (RL): JK Pärnu Sadam, FC EstHam United, JK Karskem Karsklus

Second round (1/32)
The draw for the second round was made on 20 May 2021.

Third round (1/16)
The draw for the third round was made on 27 July 2021.

Fourth round (1/8)
The draw for the third round was made on 24 August 2021.

Quarter-finals

Semi-finals

Final

References

External links
 Official website 
 Estonian Cap on Soccerway.com

Estonian Cup seasons
Cup
Cup
Estonian